Bella Vista is a city in Benton County, Arkansas, United States. First established in 1917  as a summer resort destination, Bella Vista has evolved and redesigned itself over the succeeding years. Bella Vista became a retirement community in 1965, and, after much contention and a 2006 vote of its property owners, became an incorporated city. 

Following its official incorporation on January 1, 2007, the new city government took over the police department, fire department, streets, trash removal and other city functions, while the Property Owners Association (POA) retained control of the many amenities available to members (property owners) and their guests. 

Amenities include numerous parks, clubhouses with workout areas, swimming pools, five 18-hole golf courses, two nine-hole golf course, seven lakes with fishing and boat docks (three ski lakes), a marina, swimming beach, putt putt golf courses and tennis courts, dog park, softball field, and extensive hiking and biking trails.

The city of Bella Vista is located on the Springfield Plateau of the Ozark Mountains. Oak/hickory forests, along with valleys, creeks, and steep rises, characterize the city's topography. Bella Vista is located north of Bentonville and Rogers within the Northwest Arkansas region. The city has been experiencing a population and building boom in recent years, as indicated by a 60% growth in population between the 2000 and 2010 censuses.

Geography
Bella Vista is located in northern Benton County. Its northern border is the Missouri state line.

Demographics

2020 census

As of the 2020 United States census, there were 30,104 people, 12,396 households, and 8,792 families residing in the city.

2000 census
As of the census of 2000, there were 16,582 people, 7,818 households, and 6,004 families residing in the community, which at the time was recorded as a census-designated place (CDP). The population density was 252.8 inhabitants per square mile (97.6/km2). The racial makeup of the CDP was 97.87% White, 0.18% Black or African American, 0.69% Native American, 0.27% Asian, 0.01% Pacific Islander, 0.20% from other races, and 0.78% from two or more races. Hispanic or Latino of any race were 1.01% of the population.

There were 7,818 households, out of which 13.5% had children under the age of 18 living with them, 72.4% were married couples living together, 3.2% had a female householder with no husband present, and 23.2% were non-families. 20.5% of all households were made up of individuals, and 13.3% had someone living alone who was 65 years of age or older. The average household size was 2.10 and the average family size was 2.38.

In the CDP, the population was spread out, with 12.3% under the age of 18, 3.0% from 18 to 24, 16.4% from 25 to 44, 26.3% from 45 to 64, and 41.9% who were 65 years of age or older. The median age was 61 years. For every 100 females, there were 92.5 males. For every 100 females age 18 and over, there were 90.9 males.

The median income for a household in the CDP was $44,090, and the median income for a family was $48,233. Males had a median income of $34,547 versus $24,690 for females. The per capita income for the CDP was $25,406. About 1.5% of families and 2.5% of the population were below the poverty line, including 3.7% of those under the age of 18 and 1.0% of those 65 and older.

Government

Bella Vista's Declarations and Protective Covenants is the "rule book" that governs the POA. The Property Owners Association must follow this "rule book" composed of various articles. There are Class A and Class B members of the POA. Class B refers to Cooper Communities, the land developer, who gets 10 votes per lot owned and Class A refers to lot private lot purchasers who receive one vote per lot owned. Cooper Communities now owns too few lots to sway the vote. Both Class A and class B members must approve a vote before it is binding.

The POA is governed by a nine-member Board of Directors who serve three-year terms. They set the direction and long-term objectives for the POA guided by Bella Vista's declarations and protective covenants. The day-to-day activity of the POA is directed by its general manager, with division heads and site managers responsible for the various departments and facilities.

The residents voted in 2006 to incorporate as an official city effective January 1, 2007. The POA still remains intact to service the recreational amenities and provide water, but the City of Bella Vista now has responsibility for police, fire, streets, library, community development, and other services.

Parks and recreation

Lakes

Bella Vista has seven lakes. These lakes are not "public" in that only members of the community or their guests are permitted to use them. Lake Ann, Lake Windsor, and Lake Loch Lomond are the largest all-sports lakes in the town. Lake Avalon, Lake Norwood, and Lake Rayburn are primarily fishing lakes with "no-wake" restrictions. Current POA boat permits are required, as are Arkansas fishing licenses, when fishing Bella Vista lakes. No personal water crafts (AKA: Jet Skis) are allowed on any of the Bella Vista lakes, however, only 20 miles east of Bella Vista is Beaver Lake, a 31,700 acre US Army Corps of Engineers Lake, and Jet Skis are welcome there.

Lake Windsor is also an unlimited power lake, and water skiing is allowed.  
Loch Lomond is the largest of all the lakes in the city. There is no power limit, skiing is allowed, and boat rental is offered.
Lake Avalon is a limited-power lake that features an enclosed, heated fishing dock located off Tamworth Circle.
The Lake Norwood launching ramp is located north of Harp's Food Store in Town Center. This is a limited-power lake.
This lake has limited-power regulations. It also features a designated swimming area and a launching ramp that is accessible from Lakeside Drive.

Trails

Lake Bella Vista, formerly part of Bella Vista, and the 1.8 mile walking/biking trail that goes around the lake is now part of the City of Bentonville Parks system. In the center of Bella Vista is the Tanyard Creek Nature Trail below the Lake Windsor dam. It has a footbridge and some waterfalls except during dry times. In October 2016 the City of Bella Vista, with the cooperation of the Property Owners Association, opened  of hiking and mountain bike trails entitled 'The Back 40' which is located on the east side of the city. The trail Master Plan developed in 2015 shows  over the next 10+ years. The next 40+ miles to be located within the central part of the city are in the planning stage.

Education
The following school districts serve the city. On the east side is the Bentonville School District, and on the west side is Gravette School District. A few blocks in the east are zoned to the Pea Ridge School District.

The Bentonville portion is zoned to the following schools:
 Cooper Elementary School, Thomas Jefferson Elementary School, and Sugar Creek Elementary School have separate sections.
 Most of the section is zoned to Old High Middle while some sections to the southeast are zoned to Ruth Barker Middle School and some to the southwest are zoned to Ardis Ann Middle School.
 Washington Junior High School and Lincoln Junior High School have separate sections.
 All of that portion of Bella Vista is zoned to Bentonville High School.

Also serving the city is a private preschool, Bella Vista Montessori Academy. Cooper Elementary, part of the Bentonville District, is a K-4. The Bentonville School district is planning two new schools for Bella Vista students.

Northwest Arkansas Community College is also part of the community, with its main branch in Bentonville near I-49 Exit 86.

Infrastructure

Electricity
Carroll Electric Cooperative provides electricity for Bella Vista residents.

Public safety

The Bella Vista Fire Department is a career fire department with four fully staffed fire stations. There are three shifts with 16 career firefighters on each shift. The fire department also provides Advanced Life Support paramedic service to the city with six ambulances. In 2010, the department took control over the Bella Vista Ambulance Services.

Transportation

The final segment of Interstate 49 (I-49), which runs from Fort Smith, Arkansas to Kansas City, Missouri, was completed around Bella Vista on October 1, 2021. The new route bypassed Bella Vista to the south and west, removing through traffic from Highway 71, which had seen increasing traffic congestion over the decades. I-49 has four exits providing access to Bella Vista: US 71 (Bella Vista Way), two exits with Highway 72, and Benton County Road 34 (CR 34, Rocky Dell Hollow Road).

Bella Vista Way is a four-lane controlled access divided highway that bisects the city from north to south. Two Arkansas state highways cross Bella Vista: Highway 279 (Forest Hills Boulevard) runs north-south from Gravette to Missouri, and Highway 340 (Lancashire Boulevard) from east to west from Highway 279 to Missouri. Almost all of the remaining street network in Bella Vista is laid out using a street hierarchy typical of large residential subdivisions, with hundreds of cul-de-sac streets.

Solid waste
The POA provides water service to Bella Vista residents. The City of Bella Vista contracts with Republic Services for trash collection. There also are two semi-annual pick ups of large items.

Stump Dump Fire of 2018
A dump site had begun an underground fire in August 2018. In December 2018, health officials declared the air within a half-mile radius around the property was at unhealthy levels on one occasion. An emergency declaration was made by Gov. Asa Hutchinson. The Bella Vista POA took over this project in early May 2019 and had the fire extinguished in less than 30 days.

Water and wastewater
Village Waste Water provides sewer service to portions of Bella Vista.

Notable people
Donna Hutchinson, member of the Arkansas House of Representatives from 2007 to 2013
Jim Sheets, member of the Arkansas House from 1967 to 1968 in the Winthrop Rockefeller administration, retired resident of Bella Vista
 Garth Smith, award winning pianist, composer and musician noted for his contributions to LDS Gospel Music.

See also
 Mildred B. Cooper Memorial Chapel

References

External links
City of Bella Vista official website

 
Cities in Benton County, Arkansas
Northwest Arkansas
Former census-designated places in Arkansas
Cities in Arkansas
Populated places established in 2006
1917 establishments in Arkansas